Shirvan Rural District is a rural district (dehestan) in the Central District of Borujerd County, Lorestan Province, Iran. At the 2006 census, its population was 21,710, in 5,351 families. The rural district has 54 villages.

See also 
 Ban Shirvan
 Bi Bi Shirvan
 Karkhaneh-ye Qand-e Shirvan
 Now Shirvan Kola
 Shirvan County
 Shirvan, Iran
 Shirvan, Lorestan
 Shirvan Mahalleh
 Shirvan Shahlu

References 

Rural Districts of Lorestan Province
Borujerd County